Flávio Roberto Kretzer (born 2 October 1979 in Brazil) is a retired Brazilian footballer.

Career

In 2005, Kretzer won the 2005 Club World Cup with Sao Paulo.

Throughout his career, he had to undergo five surgeries, including the removal of his left kidney at the age of 28.

References

External links
 Flávio Kretzer at Soccerway

Brazilian footballers
Living people
1979 births
Association football goalkeepers
São Paulo FC players
Fortaleza Esporte Clube players
Esporte Clube Novo Hamburgo players
Uberlândia Esporte Clube players
Clube Atlético Metropolitano players
Tombense Futebol Clube players